WZRD may refer to:

 WZRD (band), an American alternative-pop rock duo
 WZRD (album), the aforementioned band's self-titled debut album
 WZRD (FM), a radio station (88.3 FM) licensed to serve Chicago, Illinois, United States